Ruvins Vitenbergs (1868 — 1931) was a Latvian merchant and politician of a Jewish descent. He was a deputy of first and second Saeima, and served in Daugavpils city council. He had never spoken from the rostrum as a Member of the Saeima.

Politics
Vitenberg was a member of political party Agudas Israel in first and second Saeima.

References

1931 deaths
1868 births
People from Daugavpils
People from Dvinsky Uyezd
Jewish Latvian politicians
Agudas Israel (Latvia) politicians
Deputies of the 1st Saeima
Deputies of the 2nd Saeima